José Ramón Martínez Larrauri (born 12 January 1940) is a Spanish retired footballer who played as a defender.

Football career
Born in Bilbao, Biscay, Larrauri only played for two clubs during his 14-year senior career. He started out at SD Indautxu, in Segunda División.

In 1965, Larrauri was bought by Athletic Bilbao. He made his debut in La Liga on 19 September, in a 1–0 home win against Valencia CF; during his nine-year spell at the San Mamés Stadium he played 277 games overall, including 24 in European competition.

Honours
Copa del Generalísimo: 1969, 1972–73

References

External links

1940 births
Living people
Spanish footballers
Footballers from Bilbao
La Liga players
Segunda División players
SD Indautxu footballers
Athletic Bilbao footballers
Association football defenders